The 2023 Louisiana Tech Bulldogs football team will represent Louisiana Tech University in the 2023 NCAA Division I FBS football season. The Bulldogs will play their home games at Joe Aillet Stadium in Ruston, Louisiana, and will compete members of Conference USA. They will be led by second-year head coach Sonny Cumbie.

Schedule
Louisiana Tech and Conference USA announced the 2023 football schedule on January 10, 2023.

References

Louisiana Tech
Louisiana Tech Bulldogs football seasons
Louisiana Tech Bulldogs football